The International Test Pilots School Canada (ITPS Canada) located in London, Ontario, is one of the eight test pilot schools recognized globally by the international Society of Experimental Test Pilots and the Society of Flight Test Engineers. The school trains test pilots and flight test engineers. It is the first civilian test pilot school in Canada. ITPS Canada is registered as an Authorized Training Organization by the European Aviation Safety Agency.  It shares some facilities with and neighbours the Jet Aircraft Museum at London International Airport.

History 
ITPS first offered flight test training in 1986, when established by a previous senior staff member of the Empire Test Pilots School in the United Kingdom.  The school was first located in Cranfield in England, working alongside the prestigious College of Aeronautics at Cranfield University.

In 2001, the school moved its operations to the Aerospace Engineering Test Establishment located at CFB Cold Lake before moving to its current location at  London International Airport, Ontario in 2005.  In 2017, the school was recognized by the Society of Experimental Test Pilots. In 2019, ITPS Canada hosted the international 8th Annual Flight Test Seminar. Operations include a 10,000 square foot modern offices and classrooms and a 27,000 square foot hangar.

Training 
The curriculum includes both long and short courses focusing on flight tests. Flight test graduate and diploma courses are offered, the former typically for military students. Test planning, test flying, data analysis and report writing are all part of the training. Students from around the world are trained using various military fighters, training jets, light airplanes, helicopters and flight simulators. One of Australia's first RAAF female pilots, Robyn Clay-Williams, trained at ITPS

Staff 
ITPS Canada has staff members from multiple countries including academics, retired military veterans, maintenance personnel and test pilot graduates in the field of flight testing and flight test engineering. Notable staff over the years included retired Canadian Space Agency astronaut and pilot Bjarni Tryggvason who flew on Space Shuttle Discovery.

Aircraft 
As of February 2023, ITPS Canada has the following aircraft registered with Transport Canada and operate as Nav Canada airline designator SA, and telephony STALLION.

See also 

 List of test pilot schools

References 

Test pilot schools
Educational institutions established in 1986
Education in London, Ontario
1986 establishments in Ontario